The county of West Sussex
is divided into 8 parliamentary constituencies
- 2 borough constituencies
and 6 county constituencies.

Constituencies

Historic list of constituencies in West Sussex

Used from 1950 to 1974 

 Arundel and Shoreham
 Chichester
 Horsham
 Worthing

Used from 1974 to 1983 

 Arundel
 Chichester
 Horsham and Crawley
 Shoreham
 Worthing

Used from 1983 to 1997 

 Arundel
 Chichester
 Crawley
 Horsham
 Mid Sussex
 Shoreham
 Worthing

The Local Government Act 1972 moved the District of Mid Sussex into West Sussex from East Sussex. This change was put into effect in the Parliamentary constituency boundaries for the 1983 boundary changes.

2010 boundary changes
Under the Fifth Periodic Review of Westminster constituencies, the Boundary Commission for England decided to retain the existing 8 constituencies in West Sussex, with minor changes to realign constituency boundaries with those of current local government wards, and to reduce the electoral disparity between constituencies.

Proposed boundary changes 
See 2023 Periodic Review of Westminster constituencies for further details.

Following the abandonment of the Sixth Periodic Review (the 2018 review), the Boundary Commission for England formally launched the 2023 Review on 5 January 2021. Initial proposals were published on 8 June 2021 and, following two periods of public consultation, revised proposals were published on 8 November 2022. Final proposals will be published by 1 July 2023.

The commission has proposed that West Sussex be combined with East Sussex as a sub-region of the South East Region, resulting in the creation of a new cross-county boundary constituency named East Grinstead and Uckfield.

The following constituencies are proposed:

Containing electoral wards from Adur

 East Worthing and Shoreham (part)

Containing electoral wards from Arun

 Arundel and South Downs (part)
 Bognor Regis and Littlehampton
 Chichester (part)
 Worthing West (part)

Containing electoral wards from Chichester

 Arundel and South Downs (part)
 Chichester (part)

Containing electoral wards from Crawley

 Crawley

Containing electoral wards from Horsham

 Arundel and South Downs (part)

 Horsham

Containing electoral wards from Mid Sussex

 East Grinstead and Uckfield (also contains parts of Lewes and Wealden Districts in East Sussex)
 Mid Sussex

Containing electoral wards from Worthing

 East Worthing and Shoreham (part)
 Worthing West (part)

Results history
Primary data source: House of Commons research briefing - General election results from 1918 to 2019

2019 
The number of votes cast for each political party who fielded candidates in constituencies comprising West Sussex in the 2019 general election were as follows:

Percentage votes 

11983 & 1987 - SDP-Liberal Alliance

* Included in Other

Seats

Maps

Historical representation by party
A cell marked → (with a different colour background to the preceding cell) indicates that the previous MP continued to sit under a new party name.

The Local Government Act 1972 moved the District of Mid Sussex into West Sussex from East Sussex. This change was put into effect in the Parliamentary constituency boundaries for the 1983 boundary changes.

Since 1885 only two MPs have won elections who were not members of the Conservative Party: one Liberal MP in 1923 and one Labour MP in 1997, 2001 and 2005.

1885 to 1918

1918 to 1950

1950 to 1983

1983 to present

See also
 List of parliamentary constituencies in the South East (region)

Notes

References

Sussex, West
Politics of West Sussex
West Sussex-related lists